Prosymna is a genus of elapoid snake. It is the only genus in the family Prosymnidae. They were formerly placed as a subfamily of the Lamprophiidae, but have been more recently identified as a distinct family.

Geographic range
The genus Prosymna is endemic to Sub-Saharan Africa.

Species
Prosymna ambigua 
Prosymna angolensis 
Prosymna bivittata 
Prosymna confusa  - plain shovel-snout snake
Prosymna frontalis 
Prosymna greigerti 
Prosymna janii 
Prosymna lineata 
Prosymna lisima  - Kalahari shovel-snout snake
Prosymna meleagris 
Prosymna ornatissima 
Prosymna pitmani 
Prosymna ruspolii 
Prosymna semifasciata 
Prosymna somalica 
Prosymna stuhlmanni 
Prosymna sundevalli 
Prosymna visseri 

Nota bene: A binomial authority in parentheses indicates that the species was originally described in a genus other than Prosymna.

References

Further reading 

 
 
 

Snake genera
Alethinophidia
Taxa named by John Edward Gray